Philipp Bouhler (11 September 1899 – 19 May 1945) was a German senior Nazi Party functionary who was both a  (National Leader) and Chief of the Chancellery of the Führer of the NSDAP.

Bouhler was arrested on 10 May 1945 by American troops. He committed suicide on 19 May 1945 while in the U.S. internment camp at Zell am See in Austria.

Early life 
Bouhler was born in Munich, to a retired colonel, and spent five years in the Royal Bavarian Cadet Corps. He entered the 1st Royal Bavarian Foot Artillery Regiment in 1916 during the First World War, was commissioned as a Leutnant in July 1917, and was badly wounded the next month. He was awarded the Iron Cross, 2nd class, and was hospitalized through the end of the war. From 1919 to 1920, he studied philosophy and in 1921 became a contributor in the publishing house that put out the Nazi Party newspaper Völkischer Beobachter.

Nazi functionary

Bouhler joined the Nazi Party (NSDAP) in July 1922 with membership number 12. By late 1922 he had become deputy business manager of the NSDAP under Max Amann. He took part in the failed Beer Hall Putsch in Munich and when the Party was banned, became the Business Manager for the Nazi front organization, the Greater German People's Community, based in Munich. 

Upon the refounding of the party on 27 February 1925, he immediately rejoined and was made National Business Manager of the NSDAP, holding this post until November 1934. After the seizure of power in 1933, he was elected as a member of the Reichstag for electoral constituency 18, Southern Westphalia. On 2 June 1933 Hitler appointed him a Reichsleiter, the second highest political rank in the Nazi Party. He joined the SS in the rank of SS-Gruppenführer on 20 April 1933 with membership number: 54,932. On 30 January 1936, Bouhler was promoted to the rank of SS-Obergruppenführer.

From the end of August to the end of October 1934, Bouhler was police president of Munich. In September he was made a member of the Academy for German Law. He was next appointed chief of Adolf Hitler's Chancellery, a post specially created on 17 November 1934 that was first and foremost set aside for party business. He held that position until 23 April 1945. In this job, for instance, secret decrees might be prepared, or internal business managed, before being brought before Adolf Hitler. Moreover, Bouhler was chairman of the "Official Party Inspection Commission for the Protection of National Socialist Literature" (Der Chef der Kanzlei des Führers und Vorsitzender der Parteiamtlichen Prüfungskommission zum Schutze des NS-Schrifttums), which determined what writings were and were not suitable for Nazi society.

Bouhler's office was responsible for all correspondence for Hitler, which included private and internal communications as well as responding to public inquiries (for example, requests for material help, godfathership, jobs, clemency, NSDAP business, and birthday wishes). His personal adjutant was SS-Sturmbannführer Karl Freiherr Michel von Tüßling. By 1944, much of the functions of the Kanzlei des Führers were absorbed by the Party Chancellery (Parteikanzlei) under Martin Bormann.

During the war, Bouhler published Der großdeutsche Freiheitskampf ("the greater German freedom struggle"), a three volume book series of speeches given by Hitler from September 1, 1939, to March 15, 1942.

War crimes

Bouhler was responsible for the killing of disabled German citizens. By order of Hitler (backdated to 1 September 1939), Bouhler with Karl Brandt developed the Nazis' early euthanasia program, Aktion T4 in which mentally ill and physically disabled people were killed. The actual implementation was supervised by Bouhler. Various methods of killing were tried out. The first killing facility was Schloss Hartheim in Upper Austria. The knowledge gained from the euthanasia program was later applied to the industrialized annihilation of other groups of people, especially the Jews.

In 1941 Bouhler and Heinrich Himmler initiated Aktion 14f13. Bouhler instructed the head of the Hauptamt II ("main office ll") of Hitler's Chancellery, the Oberdienstleiter Viktor Brack to implement this order. Brack was already in charge of the various front operations of T4.

The scheme operated under the Concentration Camps Inspector and the Reichsführer-SS under the name "Sonderbehandlung 14f13". The combination of numbers and letters was derived from the SS record-keeping system and consists of the number "14" for the Concentration Camps Inspector, the letter "f" for the German word "deaths" (Todesfälle), and the number "13" for the means of killing, in this case, for gassing in the T4 killing centers. "Sonderbehandlung" ("special treatment") was the euphemistic term for execution or killing.

In 1942, Bouhler published the book "Napoleon – Kometenbahn eines Genies" (Napoleon – A Genius's Cometary Path), which became a favorite of Hitler's. He had also published a Nazi publication Kampf um Deutschland (Fight for Germany) in 1938.

Capture and suicide
Bouhler and his wife, Helene, were arrested by American troops at Schloss Fischhorn in Bruck near Zell-am-See on 10 May 1945. Helene jumped to her death from a window at Schloss Fischhorn. On 19 May, Bouhler killed himself using a cyanide capsule while in the US internment camp at Zell-am-See. The couple had no children.

Awards and Nazi Party decorations
 Iron Cross 2nd Class (Eisernes Kreuz 2. Klasse) 1914
 Wound Badge (World War I) in Black
 Blood Order
 War Merit Cross 2nd and 1st Class	
 Honour Chevron for the Old Guard

See also 
Action Reinhard

Notes

References

Bibliography

External links 

Phillipp Bouhler Papers at the Seeley G. Mudd Manuscript Library, Princeton University
 Adolf Hitler: A Short Sketch of His Life by Bouhler 
 

1899 births
1945 suicides
Aktion T4 personnel
German Army personnel of World War I
German police chiefs
Greater German People's Community politicians
Members of the Academy for German Law
Members of the Reichstag of Nazi Germany
Militant League for German Culture members
Nazi Party officials
Nazi Party politicians
Nazis who committed suicide in prison custody
Prisoners who died in United States military detention
Nazis who participated in the Beer Hall Putsch
People from Munich
Recipients of the Iron Cross (1914), 2nd class
Recipients of the War Merit Cross
Reichsleiters
SS-Obergruppenführer
Suicides by cyanide poisoning
Nazis who committed suicide in Austria